Gavin Nolan (born 1977) is a Welsh painter and artist. Born in Cardiff, he was educated at Loughborough University and The Royal Academy of Arts, London. His 2010 show at Charlie Smith London featured portraits of celebrity suicides.  He was one of the founding members of Rockwell Gallery in Dalston, London, which was from 2002 to 2007 an influential artists' run space.

He now teaches at a school

References

1977 births
Living people
Alumni of Loughborough University
Artists from Cardiff
20th-century Welsh painters
20th-century British male artists
21st-century Welsh painters
21st-century Welsh male artists
21st-century male artists
English portrait painters
British contemporary artists
Welsh portrait painters
Welsh male painters
20th-century Welsh male artists